Hispano-Flemish style is a term coined by the Spanish art historian Elías Tormo to designate works of art produced in Spain in a hybrid style that shows elements of Northern Renaissance artistic innovations together with elements of medieval Iberian artistic traditions, predominantly Mudéjar.

Artworks
Such works could be produced both by Flemish artists employed on projects in the Iberian peninsula, and by Iberian artists whose training or inspiration shows Northern influence. Particularly major works in this style were created in the late 15th and early 16th centuries, especially during the reign of Isabel I of Castile. These notably include tombs, funerary chapels, sculpture, choir stalls, stained glass, and panel paintings influenced by Early Netherlandish painting.

Artists
Artists in the Hispano-Flemish style include the painters Fernando Gallego, Bartolomé Bermejo, Pedro Berruguete and Juan de Flandes, the sculptor Gil de Siloe, and the architect Hannequin de Bruselas.

Further reading
 Ronda Kasl, The Making of Hispano-Flemish Style: Art, Commerce, and Politics in Fifteenth-Century Castile (Turnhout: Brepols, 2014).

References

Spanish art
Renaissance art
Early Netherlandish art